This is a selection of portmanteau words.

Animals

Hybrids 

blynx, from bobcat and lynx
bougar, from bobcat and cougar
cama, from camel and llama
caraval, from caracal and serval
cattalo, from cattle and buffalo
donkra, from donkey and zebra (progeny of donkey stallion and zebra mare) cf. zedonk below
geep, from goat and sheep (progeny of)
grolar bear, from grizzly bear and polar bear
hebra, from horse and zebra (progeny of horse stallion and zebra mare) cf. zorse below
hinny, from horse and jenny (progeny of horse stallion and donkey mare)
humanzee, from human and chimpanzee
leoger, from leopard and tiger
leopon, from leopard and lion
liger, from lion and tiger (progeny of male lion and tigress) cf. tiglon/tigon below
lijagulep, from lion, jaguar, and leopard
liliger, from lion and liger
litigon, from lion and tigon
llamanaco, from llama and guanaco
marlot, from margay and ocelot
ocebob, from ocelot and bobcat
pumapard, from puma and leopard
pumpkingill, from pumpkinseed and bluegill
servical, from serval and caracal
splake, from speckled male brook trout and female lake trout (progeny of)
sturddlefish, from Russian sturgeon and American paddlefish
tigard, from tiger and leopard
tigon, from tiger and lion (progeny of male tiger and lioness) cf. liger above
tiliger, from tiger and liger
wallaroo, from wallaby and kangaroo
wholphin, from whale and dolphin
yakow, from yak and cow
yattle, from yak and cattle
zedonk, from zebra and donkey (progeny of zebra stallion and donkey mare) cf. donkra above
zorse, from zebra and horse (progeny of zebra stallion and horse mare) cf. hebra above

Mixed breeds

Dogs 

cockapoo, from cocker spaniel and poodle (with influence from cockatoo)
dorgi, from dachshund and Welsh corgi
goldendoodle, from golden retriever and poodle ("doodle" in reference to the Labradoodle)
Labradoodle, from Labrador retriever and poodle
Maltipoo, from Maltese and poodle
Pekapoo, from Pekingese and poodle (with influence from peekaboo)
puggle, from pug and beagle
schnoodle, from schnauzer and poodle

Other 
beefalo, from beef and buffalo
Brangus, from Brahman and Angus breeds of cattle
Wangus, from Wagyu and Angus breeds of cattle

Characteristics 
camelopard, from camel and leopard
Beelzebufo, from Beelzebub and Bufo
sploot, from splay and scoot
squitten, from squirrel and kitten

Fictional 

Aristocats, from aristocrats and cats
buggalo, from bug and buffalo
jackalope, from jackrabbit and antelope
mammophant, from mammoth and elephant
pegacorn, from Pegasus and unicorn
Pigasus, from pig and Pegasus
Predalien, from Predator and Alien
Squirtle, from squirt and turtle

Art, literature and entertainment

Agitpop, from agitprop and pop music
animatronics, from animation and electronics
animutation, from animation and mutation
Animusic, from animation and music
auditorial, from audio and editorial
autobiografiction, from autobiography and fiction
autofiction, from autobiography and fiction
batarang, from bat and boomerang
Belieber, from believer and Justin Bieber
Bennifer, from Ben Affleck and Jennifer Lopez
biopic, from biographical and motion picture
blaxploitation, from black and exploitation
bleen, from blue and green (coined by Nelson Goodman to illustrate Goodman's paradox; see grue, below)
blurple, from blue and purple
Boglins, from bog and goblins
Bollywood, from Bombay and Hollywood
Bootylicious, from booty and delicious
Brangelina, from Brad Pitt and Angelina Jolie
Britcom, from British and comedy
Britpop, from British and pop music
bromance, from bro (brother) and romance
bromantic, from bro and romantic, adjective form of bromance
Brony, from bro and pony
Bruceploitation, from Bruce Lee and exploitation
Californication, from California and fornication
cassingle, from cassette and single
Chamillionaire, from chameleon and millionaire
Chesterbelloc, from G. K. Chesterton and Hilaire Belloc
churnalism, from churned-out journalism
Cinedigm, from cinema and paradigm
Cinemax, from cinema and maximum
claymation, from clay and animation
crossplay, from crossdressing and cosplay
Death 'n' roll, from death metal and rock 'n' roll
disasterpiece, from disaster and masterpiece
Dhallywood, from Dhaka and Hollywood
docudrama, from documentary and drama
docuseries, from documentary and series
docusoap, from documentary and soap opera (serialised drama)
Dollywood, from Dolly Parton and Hollywood
Draculaura, from Dracula and name Laura, character from Monster High
dramedy, from drama and comedy
edutainment, from education and entertainment
Electrocutioner, from electrocution and executioner
faction, from fact and fiction
fanac, from fan and activity
fanslation, from fan and translation
fanzine, from fan and magazine
fauxligraphy, from faux and calligraphy
fauxlography, from faux and holography
fauxtography, from faux and photography
FUNimation, from fun and animation
Funkadelic, from funk and psychedelic
Galentine's Day, from gals and Valentine's Day
Gleeks, from Glee and geeks
glitterati, from glitter and literati
Godsmack, from God and gobsmack
Gojira (Godzilla), from ゴリラ (gorira, "gorilla") and 鯨 (kujira, "whale")
Görliwood, from Görlitz and Hollywood, a nickname for the Görlitz and Zgorzelec metropolitan area as a filming location
greige, from grey and beige
grue, from green and blue (see bleen, above)
Hamburglar, from hamburger and burglar
Hatchimals, from hatch and animals
ignorati, from ignorant and literati
infomercial, from information and commercial
infotainment, from information and entertainment
Jamiroquai, from Jam (session) and Iroquois
Japandroids, from Japanese Scream and Pleasure Droids (two band name ideas)
Japanoise, from Japanese and noise
Jedward, John and Edward Grimes
Jollywood, from Jyoti Chitraban Film Studio and Hollywood
Kollywood, from Kodambakkam and Hollywood
Kripkenstein, from Saul Kripke and Ludwig Wittgenstein
latensification, from latent and intensification
literotica, from literature and erotica
Lollywood, from Lahore and Hollywood
machinima, from machine and cinema
Mandroid, from man and android
Megxit, from Meghan, Duchess of Sussex and exit
Metroidvania, from Metroid and Castlevania
Mephiskapheles, from Mephistopheles and ska
mockumentary, from mock and documentary
Mollywood, from the combination of any of the following terms with Hollywood:
 Malayalam, when referring to Malayalam cinema
 Marathi, when referring to Marathi cinema
 The LDS Church term Molly Mormon, when referring to Mormon cinema
Monokuma, from monochrome and Japanese kuma ("bear")
Mouseketeer, from Mickey Mouse and musketeer
Muppet, from marionette and puppet
newscast, from news and broadcast
Nedna, from Ned Flanders and Edna Krabappel, from The Simpsons
Nollywood, from Nigeria and Hollywood
Odditorium, from odd and auditorium
 Ollywood, from Odia and Hollywood
Pallywood, from Palestinian and Hollywood
Parcheesi, from Parker Brothers and pachisi
Pensieve, from pensive and sieve
presstitutes, from press and prostitutes
prequiem, from preemptive and requiem
psychobilly, from psycho and rockabilly
rockabilly, from rock and hillbilly
rockumentary, from rock and documentary
scanlation, from scan and translation, used for unofficial internet-distributed translations of manga
schlockumentary, from schlock and documentary
seascape, from sea and landscape
sextra, from sex and extra (acting)
shockumentary, from shock and documentary
showmance, from show business and romance
sidequel, from side and sequel
Siliwood, from Silicon Valley and Hollywood
Skinemax, from skin and Cinemax
Slingo, from slots and bingo
smark, from smart and mark
soundscape, from sound and landscape
Spraycation, from vacation and spraypainting coined by the anonymous English Street artist Banksy for the title of his summer 2021 series of works "A Great British Spraycation"
Stucky, from Steve Rogers and Bucky Barnes
Tamagotchi, from tamago (Japanese for "egg") and uotchi (from English "watch")
telegenic, from television and photogenic
teleidoscope, from telescope and kaleidoscope
televangelist, from television and evangelist
Tollywood, from Tollygunge (when referring to West Bengal cinema) or Telugu (when referring to Telugu cinema) and Hollywood
TomKat, from Tom Cruise and Katie Holmes
tragicomedy, from tragedy and comedy
Treknology, from Star Trek and technology
Truckasaurus, from truck and Tyrannosaurus
Unwindulax, from unwind and relax
Valleywood, from Wye Valley and Hollywood
Wagatha Christie, popular name of a 2022 English defamation court case; derived from the football term "WAGs" and Agatha Christie
Waluigi, from Japanese warui ("bad") and the name Luigi
Wario, from Japanese warui and the name Mario
Wellywood, from Wellington and Hollywood

Instruments

banjitar, a combination musical instrument of a banjo and a guitar
banjolele, a combination musical instrument of a banjo and a ukulele
banjolin, a combination musical instrument of a banjo and a mandolin
escopetarra, from Spanish escopeta (shotgun/rifle) and guitarra (guitar); a guitar made from an AK-47
flumpet, from flugelhorn and trumpet
guitalele, from guitar and ukulele
guitalin, from guitar and mandolin
keytar, from keyboard and guitar
sympitar, from sympathetic string and guitar
tromboon, from trombone and bassoon
ukelin, from ukulele and violin

Titles

Alphabear, from alphabet and bear
Animaniacs, from animated and maniacs
Animatrix, from anime and The Matrix
Animorphs, from animal morphers
Banjo-Tooie, from Banjo-Kazooie and two (sequel)
BASEketball, from baseball and basketball
The Beverly Hillbillies, from Beverly Hills and hillbillies
Blacula, from black and Dracula
Bunnicula, from bunny and Dracula
Castlevania, from castle and Transylvania
Crooklyn, from crook and Brooklyn
Disturbia, from disturbed and suburbia
Ennuigi, from ennui and Luigi
ElimiDate, from eliminate and date
Evilution, from evil and evolution
Fergalicious, from Fergie and delicious
Floribama Shore, from Florida and Alabama
Frankenfish, from Frankenstein and fish
Funderdome, from funding and Thunderdome
Instrumedley, from instrument and medley
Lamprophrenia, from lampron (bright) and phrenia (mind)
Lavalantula, from lava and tarantula
Manimal, from man and animal
Manster, from man and monster
MANswers, from man and answers
Menergy, from men and energy
Morroblivion, from Morrowind and Oblivion
Mutanimals, from mutant and animals
Nintendogs, from Nintendo and dogs
Notzilla, from not and Godzilla
Piranhaconda, from piranha and anaconda
Plandemic, from plan and pandemic
Policenauts, from police and astronaut
Polygondwanaland, from polygon and Gondwanaland
Pornograffitti, from pornography and graffiti
Puppetoons, from puppets and cartoons
Quantumania, from quantum and mania
Religulous, from religion and ridiculous
Returnal, from return and eternal
Revolusongs, from revolution and songs
Roblox, from robot and blocks
Scribblenauts, from scribble and astronauts
Seaspiracy, from sea and conspiracy
Seussical, from Dr. Seuss and musical
Sharknado, from shark and tornado
Sharktopus, from shark and octopus
Sidetalk, from sidewalk and talk
Simpsorama, from The Simpsons and Futurama
Skyblivion, from The Elder Scrolls V: Skyrim and The Elder Scrolls IV: Oblivion
Skywind, from The Elder Scrolls V: Skyrim and Morrowind
Spamalot, from Spam and Camelot
SPAMasterpiece Theater, from SPAM and Masterpiece Theater
Splatoon, from splat and platoon
Spontaneanation, from spontaneous and nation
Talkartoons, from talk and cartoons
ThanksKilling, from Thanksgiving and killing
Undertale, from underground and Fairy tale
Vandread, from vanguard and dreadnought
VelociPastor, from Velociraptor and pastor
Workaholics, from work and alcoholics
Zombeavers, from zombie and beavers
Zoombies, from zoo and zombies
Zootopia (or Zootropolis), from zoo and eutopia (or metropolis)

Cuisine

bananacue, from banana and barbecue
banilla, from banana and vanilla
banoffee, from banana and toffee
banoodles, from bananas and noodles
barcade, from bar and arcade
beefaroni, from beef and macaroni
beerage, from beer and peerage
Bisquick, from biscuit and quick
broast, from broil and roast
brunch, from breakfast and lunch
Buffaranch, from Buffalo sauce and ranch dressing
camotecue, from Spanish camote (sweet potato) and barbecue
cannabutter, from cannabis and butter
Canola, from Canadian oil, low acid, the trademarked name of a specific cultivar of rapeseed developed in Canada to have a naturally low erucic acid content
chookie, from cheesecake and cookie
chork, from chopsticks and fork
Cinnabon, from cinnamon and bun
crabocado, from crab and avocado
Craisin, from cranberry and raisin
CremeSavers, from creme and Lifesavers
Croissan'wich, from croissant and sandwich
cronut, from croissant and doughnut
Dijonnaise, from Dijon and mayonnaise
dunch, from dinner and lunch
Dunkaroos, from dunk and kangaroos
enchalupa, from enchilada and chalupa
Enchirito, from enchilada and burrito
Fabanaise, from aquafaba and mayonnaise
facon, from fake and bacon
fawaffle, from falafel and waffle
flavorite, from flavor and favorite
flexitarian, from flexible and vegetarian (meaning in principle, vegetarian, but can be flexible if necessary)
freeganism, from free and veganism
froyo, from frozen and yogurt
Funfetti, from fun and confetti
Funyuns, from fun and onions
gastropub, from gastronomy and public house
glutose, from glucose and fructose
Gogurt, from go and yogurt
Hanch, from hot sauce and ranch dressing
Honeyracha, from honey and sriracha
hufu, from human and tofu
jizzcuit, from jizz and biscuit
kegerator, from keg and refrigerator
Ketchili, from ketchup and sweet chili sauce
knork, from knife and fork
Kranch, from ketchup and ranch dressing
linner, from lunch and dinner, coined in an AM/PM commercial
Manwich, from man and sandwich
Mayochup, from mayonnaise and ketchup
Mayocue, from mayonnaise and barbecue
Mayomust, from mayonnaise and mustard
Mayoracha, from mayonnaise and sriracha
menma, from ramen (拉麺) and machiku (麻竹)
pizzone, from pizza and calzone, popularized by Pizza Hut as the P'Zone
popsicle, from pop and icicle
quesalupa, from quesadilla and chalupa
quesarito, from quesadilla and burrito
Rice-A-Roni, from rice and macaroni
salsamole, from alsa and guacamole
scromlette, from scrambled eggs and omelette
soylent, from soy and lentil
soysage, from soy and sausage
spatchcock, from dispatch and cock
spife, from spoon and knife
spoodle, from spoon and ladle
sporf, from spoon, fork and knife
spork, from spoon and fork
Tarchup, from tartar sauce and ketchup
tofurkey, from tofu and turkey
totchos, from tater tots and nachos
turducken, from turkey, duck, and chicken
Vegenaise, from vegan and mayonnaise
Wasabioli, from wasabi and aioli
zoodles, from zucchini and noodles

Beverages

alcopop, from alcohol and pop
appletini, from apple and martini
beergarita, from beer and margarita
Clamato, from clam and tomato juice
coffeetini, from coffee and martini
crantini, from cranberry and martini
flirtini, from flirt and martini
frappuccino, from frappé and cappuccino
gelatini, from gelatin and martini
mangorita, from mango and margarita
Meritage, from merit and heritage
mocktail, from mock and cocktail
Nespresso, from Nestlé and espresso
Palcohol, from powder and alcohol
rumchata, from spiced rum and horchata
saketini, from sake and martini
scotchka, from scotch and vodka
seltzerita, from hard seltzer and margarita
Silk, from soy and milk
vodkatini, from vodka and martini

Hybrids

broccoflower, from broccoli and cauliflower
Brusselkale, from Brussels sprouts and kale
caulini, from cauliflower and broccolini
celtuce, from celery and lettuce
citrange, from citron and orange
citrangequat, from citrange and kumquat
citrumelo, from citrus and pommelo
garlion, from garlic and onion
Grāpple, from grape and apple
Kinnow, from 'King' (Citrus nobilis) and 'Willow Leaf' (Citrus × deliciosa)
lemonquat, from lemon and kumquat
limequat, from Key lime and kumquat
mandelo, from mandarin orange and pommelo
orangequat, from orange and kumquat
parsnip, from Pastinaca and turnip (though often confused with parsley root leftover after the leaves and stems have been snipped)
peacherine, from peach and nectarine
peacotum, from peach, apricot and plum
pineberry, from pineapple and strawberry
pluot, from plum and apricot
pomato, from potato and tomato
procimequat, from primitive Hong Kong kumquat and limequat
sunchoke, from sunflower and artichoke
tangelo, from tangerine and pomelo
tomacco, from tomato and tobacco, coined on The Simpsons, "E-i-e-i-(Annoyed Grunt)"
topepo, from tomato and sweet pepper
triticale, from Triticum (wheat) and Secale (rye)
yuzuquat, from yuzu and kumquat

General

Aberzombie, from zombie and Abercrombie & Fitch
acupressure, from acupuncture and pressure
affluenza, from affluence and influenza
airgasm, from air and orgasm
Amerind peoples, from American and Indian
Amerithrax, from American and anthrax attacks
ametrine, a gemstone composed of amethyst and citrine
ampersand, from and per se and
Amshack, from Amtrak and shack
anacronym, from anachronism and acronym (not to be confused with anachronym)
analrapist, from analyst and therapist
anecdata, from anecdote and data
anklet, from ankle and bracelet
anticipointment, from anticipation and disappointment
apronym, from apropos and acronym
aquamation, from aquatic and cremation
architourist, from architecture and tourist
arcology, from architecture and ecology
armlet, from arm and bracelet
ascared, from afraid and scared
automagical, from automatic and magical
automobilia, from automobile and memorabilia
avionics, from aviation and electronics
backronym, from backwards and acronym
bacne, from back and acne
baffound, from baffle and confound
balloonacy, from balloon and lunacy
bandkini, from bandeau and bikini
bankster, from banker and gangster
barbell, from bar and dumbbell
Barcalounger, from Edward J. Barcalo and lounger
bedaffled, from bedazzled and baffled
begpacking, from begging and backpacking
beneffectance, from beneficence and effectance
bicurious, from bisexual and curious
Bionicle, from biological and chronicle
blaccent, from black and accent – used by non-blacks who try to sound black
Blackanese, from black and Chinese or Japanese
blandiose, from bland and grandiose
Blasian, from black and Asian
blizzaster, from blizzard and disaster
blizzicane, from blizzard and hurricane
blumpkin, from blowjob and pumpkin (slang for anus)
blurse, from blessing and curse
bodacious, from bold and audacious
boldacious, from bold and audacious
booboisie, from boob and bourgeosie
bossnapping, from boss and kidnapping
botel, from boat and hotel (i.e. Boat Hotel in SEA)
boxercise, from boxing and exercise
brainiac, from brain and maniac
brandwagon, from brand and bandwagon
breathalyzer, from breath and analyzer
bromance, from brother and romance
brony, from "bro" and pony – the fanbase for My Little Pony: Friendship Is Magic
broseph, from bro and Joseph
brosephine, from bro and Josephine
budtender, from bud and bartender
bullycide, from bullying and suicide
burble, from bubble and gurgle
burkini, from burka and bikini
bussy, from boy and pussy
cablegram, from cable and telegram
camcorder, from camera and recorder
camikini, from camisole and bikini
cankles, from calf and ankles
carbage, from car and garbage
cardening, from car and gardening
carjack, from car and hijack
castrophony, from catastrophe and cacophony
catio, from cat and patio
Caucasity, from Caucasian and audacity
celesbian, from celebrity and lesbian
celebutante, from celebrity and debutante
cellophane, from cellulose and diaphane
chavtastic, from chav and fantastic (meaning, 'having many characteristics of a chav', rather than a 'fantastic chav')
chillax, from chill and relax
Chinarello, from China and Pinarello (used to describe a counterfeit Pinarello racing bike)
Chindian, meaning someone with both Chinese and Indian ethnic heritage.
Chinglish, English and Chinese mixed up to humorous effect (cf. Spanglish, Franglais, Japanglish)
chokebreaker, from chokeslam and backbreaker
chortle, from chuckle and snort (coined by Lewis Carroll)
Chrismukkah, from Christmas and Hanukkah (popularized by The O.C.)
chuggers, from charity and muggers
complisult, from compliment and insult
coopetition, from cooperation and competition
copium, from cope and opium
Count Chocula, from Count Dracula and chocolate
covidiot, from COVID-19 and idiot
cremains, from cremate and remains
crisitunity, from crisis and opportunity
cryptanalysis, from cryptogram and analysis
cryptex, from cryptology and codex
cyberdelic, from prefix cyber- and psychedelic
dadvice, from dad and advice
disastrophe, from disaster and catastrophe
Doxbridge, from Durham, Oxford, and Cambridge
draids, from dreadlocks and braids
drilldo, from drill and dildo
dumbfound, from dumb and confound
Ebonics, from ebony and phonics
ecoteur, from ecological and saboteur
electrocute, from electric and execute
endorphin, from endogenous and morphine
facekini, from face and bikini
factual, from fact and actual
fakelore, from fake and folklore
fantabulous, from fantastic and fabulous
Farmageddon, from farm and Armageddon
fatberg, from fat and iceberg
fauxhawk, from faux and mohawk
fauxmance, from faux and romance
fertigation, from fertilize and irrigation
filmanthropy, from film and philanthropy
finickity, from finicky and persnickety
firenado, from fire and tornado
flagkini, from flag and bikini
Fleshlight, from flashlight and flesh
flexicurity, from flexibility and security
flimmer, from flicker and glimmer
floof, from fluff and poof
floordrobe, from floor and wardrobe
flotel, from float and hotel
flounder, from flounce and founder or founder and blunder
flubber, from flying rubber
fluff, from flue and puff
flustrated, from flustered and frustrated
fogbow, from fog and rainbow
folksonomy, from folk and taxonomy
folktronica, from folk and electronica
foodlegger, from food and bootlegger
fooligan, from fool and hooligan
foolosophy, from fool and philosophy
Franglais, French and English mixed up to humorous effect (cf. Chinglish, Spanglish, Japanglish)
fratire, from fraternity and satire
freeter, from free (or perhaps freelance) and the German Arbeiter ("labourer")
frenemy, from friend and enemy
friendiversary, from friend and anniversary
Friendsgiving, from friends and Thanksgiving
frumious, from fuming and furious (coined by Lewis Carroll)
funemployed, from fun and unemployed
funtastic, from fun and fantastic
fursona, from furry and persona
gamestorming, from games and brainstorming
galumphing, from galloping and triumphant (coined by Lewis Carroll)
gayby, from gay and baby
gaydar, from gay and radar
gaymer, from gay and gamer
ginormous, from gigantic and enormous
glamazon, from glamorous and Amazon
glamping, from glamour and camping
glasphalt, from glass and asphalt
globesity, from global and obesity
Globish, from global and English
glocalization, from global and localization
glasstic, from glass and plastic
golliwog, from golly and polliwog
grandiloquent, from grandiose and eloquent
grasscycling, from grass and recycling
greenwash, from green and whitewash
grillbilly, from grill and hillbilly
groutfit, from gray and outfit
guesstimate, from guess and estimate
guyliner, from guy and eyeliner, eyeliner for men
Halloweekend, from Halloween and weekend
halterkini, from halter top and bikini
handicapable, from handicapped and capable
hangry, from hungry and angry
hangxiety, from hangover and anxiety
happenstance, from happening and circumstance
hasbian, from has been and lesbian
hempcrete, from hemp and concrete
herstory, from her and history
himbo, from him and bimbo
Hinglish, from Hindi and English
Hinjew, from Hinduism and Jew
hubot, from human and robot
huggle, from hug and snuggle
humanure, from human and manure
imagineering, from imagination and engineering
incognegro, from incognito and negro
indietronica, from indie (independent) and electronica
insinuendo, from insinuate and innuendo
interrobang, from interrogative and bang
intertwingle, from intertwine and intermingle
irregardless, from irrespective and regardless
Japanglish, Japanese and English mixed up to humorous effect (cf. Chinglish, Spanglish, Franglais)
jasta, from jäger and staffel, German for hunter squadron (WWI air group)
jeggings, from jeans and leggings
Jewfro, from Jew and afro
jorts, from jeans and shorts
Juneteenth, from June and nineteenth. A holiday celebrating emancipation from slavery in the United States.
kidult, from kid and adult
linoleum, from linseed oil and petroleum
mangina, from man and vagina
mankini, from man and bikini
manny, from man and nanny
manosphere, from man and atmosphere
manscaping, from man and landscaping
manssiere, from man and brassiere
manzilian, from man and Brazilian wax
Masshole, from Massachusetts and asshole
mathlete, from math and athlete
mechatronics, from mechanical and electronics
meggings, from man and leggings
meld, from melt and weld
metrosexual, from metropolitan and heterosexual
mimsy, from miserable and flimsy (coined by Lewis Carroll)
mizzle, from mist and drizzle
mockney, from mock and Cockney
momager, from mom and manager
moobs, from man and boobs
motel, from motor and hotel
Movember, from moustache and November
moxibustion, from moxa and combustion
murdercide, from murder and suicide
murse, from man and purse, or alternatively, male and nurse
Nair, from no and hair
napalm, from naphthene and palmitate
needcessity, from need and necessity
Nintendonitis, from Nintendo and tendonitis
Nuyorican, from New York and Puerto Rican
Oxbridge, from Oxford and Cambridge
palimony, from pal and alimony
paratrooper, from parachute and trooper
parkade, from parking and arcade
Pastafarian, from pasta and Rastafarian; from Pastafarianism or The Church of the Flying Spaghetti Monster
pegacorn, from pegasus and unicorn
pegasister, from pegasus and sister
permafrost, from permanent and frost
Pictionary, from picture and dictionary
pigloo, from pig and igloo
pleather, from plastic and leather
Poglish, from Polish and English
Portuñol, from Portuguese and Español (Spanish)
posistor, from positive and thermistor
prissy, from prim and fussy (or sissy)
promposal, from prom and proposal
proplifting, from propagating and shoplifting
prostitot, from prostitute and tot
protoflight, from prototype and flight (hardware)
preply, from preemptive and reply
pubikini, from pubic and bikini
punny, from pun and funny
rainscaping, from rain and landscaping
rebar, from reinforced and bar
religiose, from religious and grandiose
reprography, from reproduce and photography
Runglish, from Russian and English
Quebexican, from Quebecois and Mexican
satisficing, from satisfy and suffice
Scattergories, from scattered and categories
scribacious, from scribe and loquacious
scuzzy, from scummy and fuzzy
seekini, from see-through and bikini
sexcapade, from sex and escapade
sexercise, from sex and exercise
sexpert, from sex and expert (refers mainly to people who give advice about sex and sexual matters)
sexpionage (or sexspionage), from sex and espionage
sexploitation, from sex and exploitation
sexpo, from sex and expo
sexterity, from sex and dexterity
sexting, from sex and texting
sextortion, from sex and extortion
shamateur, from sham and amateur
shamboo, from sham and bamboo
shart, from shit and fart
shaxing, from shaving and waxing
sheanderthal, from she and Neanderthal
sheeple, from sheep and people
shero, from she and hero
shewee, from she and weewee
shotcrete, from shot and concrete
simulcasting, from simultaneous broadcasting
skeezy, from sketchy and sleazy
skinship, from skin and kinship
skirtini, from skirt and bikini
skitching, from skating and hitching
skort, from skirt and short (as in short pants)
skullet, from skull and mullet
skyjack, from sky and hijack
slacktivism, from slacker and activism
slanguage, from slang and language
slimsy, from slim and flimsy
slingkini, from slingshot and bikini
slithy, from slimy and lithe (coined by Lewis Carroll)
sliving, from slaying and living
slofie, from slow motion and selfie
slore, from slut and whore
slunt, from slut and cunt
smaze, from smoke and haze
smexy, from smart and sexy
smirting, from smoking and flirting
smize, from smile and eyes
smog, from smoke and fog
smothercate, from smother and suffocate
snarf, from snort and scarf
snark, from snide and remark
snart, from sneeze and fart
snatiation, from sneeze and satiation
snazzy, from snappy and jazzy
snice, from snow and ice
snough, from sneeze and cough
snowclone, from snowcone and clone
Snowmageddon, from snow and Armageddon
snowpocalypse, from snow and apocalypse
solemncholy, from solemn and melancholy
sorostitute, from sorority and prostitute
spamouflage, from spam and camouflage 	
spange, from spare change
Spanglish, Spanish and English mixed up to humorous effect (cf. Chinglish, Franglais, Japanglish)
Spermageddon, from sperm and Armageddon
spermjacking, from sperm and hijacking
splatter, from splash and spatter
spottle, from spots (cannabis) and bottle
sprelve, from sprite and elve
splendiloquent, from splendid and eloquent
spunion, from spun out and onion
spunk, from spark and funk
squander, from scatter and wander
squarson, from squire and parson
squelch, from squash, quell, and quench
squiggle, from squirm and wiggle
squipper, from survival, equipment, and fitter
squircle, from square and circle
squirl, from squiggle and twirl or whirl
squizz, from squint and quiz
starburns, from star and sideburns
starchitect, from star and architect
stash, from store and cache
statite, from static and satellite
staycation, from stay and vacation
stealthie, from stealth and selfie
steez, from style and ease
stringkini, from string and bikini
superveillance, supervision and surveillance
swapportunity, from swap and opportunity, an opportunity to swap
swaption, from swap and option
tactleneck, from tactical and turtleneck
tankini, from tank top and bikini
Taglish, from Tagalog and English
tarmac, from tar and macadam
tanorexia, from tan and anorexia
telethon, from television and marathon
tensegrity, from tensional and integrity
testilying, from testifying and lying
Thanksgivukkah, from Thanksgiving Day and Hanukkah
thembo, from them and bimbo
thermistor, from thermal and resistor
threepeat, from three and repeat
throuple, a committed personal partnered relationship between three people as a connected unit (in some instances also known as a "Ménage à trois")
thrussy, from throat and pussy
tiparillo, from tip and cigarillo
toonie, from two and loonie
transceiver, from transmitter and receiver
transistor, from transfer and resistor
transmogrify, from transfigure and modify
transponder, from transmitter and responder
transvestigation, from transgender and investigation
treggings, from trousers and leggings
triggernometry, from trigger and trigonometry
trikini, from triple and bikini
trilemma, from triple and dilemma
trimmigrant, from (cannabis) trimming and immigrant
trustafarian, from trust fund and Rastafarian
tween, from teen and between
twincest, from twins and incest
twirl, from twist and whirl
unvitation, from uninvited and invitation
urinalysis, from urine and analysis
utilidor, from utilities and corridor
vacationship, from vacation and relationship
vagenda, from vagina and agenda
vagrant, from vagabond and migrant
vajazzle, from vagina and bedazzle
vajungle, from vagina and jungle
vattoo, from vagina and tattoo
Velcro, from velvet and crochet
vitamer, from vitamin and isomer
voluntourist, from volunteer and tourist
vortal, from vertical and portal
vurp, from vomit and burp
waithood, from wait and adulthood
wasband, from was and husband
weediquette, from weed and etiquette
weedsplain, from weed and explain
Wenglish, from Welsh and English
wikiquette, from wiki and etiquette
Wiktionary, from wiki and dictionary
workaholic, from work and alcoholic
workiversary, from work and anniversary
wuss, from wimp and puss
yestergay, from yesterday and gay
zombocalypse, from zombie and apocalypse
HMS Zubian, Royal Navy destroyer built from parts of damaged HMS Zulu and HMS Nubian

Internet and computing

alphanumeric, from alphabetic and numeric
ASCIIbetical, from ASCII and alphabetical
balun, from balanced and unbalanced
bitmoji, from bit and emoji
blogosphere, from blog and logosphere
blorph, from blend and morph
brogrammer, from bro and programmer
brouter, from bridge and router
bullshot, from bullshit and screenshot
Chaturbate, from chat and masturbate
codec, from coder and decoder
companding, from compressing and expanding
concolic, from concrete and symbolic
cryptography. from κεκρυμμένος (hidden) and Γραφή (writing)
cryptocurrency, from cryptography and currency
cybrarian, from cyber and librarian
Darwine, from Darwin and WINE
debconf, from Debian and configuration
datacasting, from data and broadcasting
dataveillance, from data and surveillance
deepfake, from deep learning and fake
desknote, from desktop and notebook
digerati, from digital and literati
emoticon, from emotion and icon
favicon, from favourite and icon
Fediverse, from federation and universe
Finsta, from fake and Instagram
folksonomy, from folk and taxonomy
frecency, from frequency and recency
freemium, from free and premium
Hackintosh, from hack and Macintosh
hacktivism, from hack and activism
Hatreon, from hate and Patreon
incel, from involuntary and celibate
Intellivision, from intelligent and television
Joy-Con, from joystick and controller
Jython, from Java and Python
Kinect, from kinetic and connection
knowledgebase, from knowledge and database
Linux, from Linus and Unix
listicle, from list and article
Markiplier, from the name Mark and multiplier
memex, from memory and index
Mobilegeddon, from mobile and Armageddon
modem, from modulator and demodulator
modmin, from moderator and admin
Mozilla, from "mosaic killer" and Godzilla
netiquette, from Internet and etiquette
netizen, from (Inter)net and citizen
phablet, from phone and tablet
pharming, from phishing and farming
pixel, from picture and element
podcast, from iPod and broadcast
Project Chanology, from chan (a common suffix for the titles of imageboards) and Scientology
QAnonsense, from QAnon and nonsense
Raspbian, from Raspberry Pi and Debian
reddiquette, from Reddit and etiquette
resel, from resolution and element
screenager, from screen and teenager
screenshot, from screen and snapshot
SerDes, from serialize and deserialize
Skype, from sky and peer-to-peer
spamdexing, from spam and indexing
spaxel, from spatial and pixel
sporgery, from spam and forgery
texel, from texture and element
textonym, from text and synonym
Throwbot, from throw and robot
treap, from tree and heap
trixel, from triangle and pixel
Twitterverse, from Twitter and universe
upsert, from update and insert
vlog, from video and blog
voxel, from volume and pixel
wardriving, from wardialing and driving
webcast, from World Wide Web and broadcast
webinar, from World Wide Web and seminar
webisode, from World Wide Web and episode
webtoon, from World Wide Web and cartoon
widget, from window and gadget
Wikipedia, from wiki and encyclopedia
Wintel, from Windows and Intel

Marketing

advertainment, from advertising and entertainment
advertorial, from advertising and editorial
entreporneur, from entrepreneur and porn
innoventing, from innovating and inventing
marchitecture, from marketing and architecture
cineplex, from cinema and complex (building)
manufactroversy, from manufacture and controversy
masstige, from mass market and prestige
multiplex, from multiple and complex – this word has a different meaning in telecommunications
petrodollar, from petroleum and dollar
prosumer, from either producer or professional and consumer
subvertising, from subverting and advertising
telemarketing, from telephone and marketing
tenderpreneur, from tendering and entrepreneur
wantrepreneur, from want and entrepreneur

Organizations and companies

Accenture, from accent and future (accent on the future)
Alitalia, from Ali (Italian translation for wings) and Italia (Italy)
Alstom, from Alsace and Thompson-Houston. Originally spelled "Alsthom", the "h" was removed in 2008 (the company was named GEC-Alsthom at the time).
Amtrak, from American and track
Austar, from Australia and star
Bapes, from bathing and ape
Binance, from binary and finance
Calutron, from California University Cyclotron
Carvana, from car and nirvāṇa
Citigroup, from Citicorp and Travelers Group
Citizendium, from Citizens' Compendium
Comcast, from communication and broadcast
Compaq, from compatibility and quality
Conservapedia, from conservative and Wikipedia
Creamsicle, from cream and popsicle
Danimals, from Dannon and animals
Dash (cryptocurrency), from Digital and Cash
Ecosia, from ecology and Acacia
Edexcel, from educational and excellence
Emergen-C, from emergency and vitamin C
Extell, from excellence and intelligence
Froogle, from frugal and Google
Fruitopia, from fruit and utopia
Fudgsicle, from fudge and popsicle
Funimation, from fun and animation
Garmin, from Gary Burrell and Min Kao
Googleplex, from Google and complex (meaning a complex of buildings) (with influence from googolplex)
Groupon, from group and coupon
Ideanomics, from idea and economics
Imagineering, from Imagine (or Imagination) and Engineering
LATAM, from Lan Airlines and TAM Airlines
Lenovo, from Legend and "novo" (Latin ablative for "new")
Medi-Cal, California's name for their Medicaid program, from medical and California
Medicaid, from medicine/medical and aid
Medicare, from medicine/medical and care
Netflix, from internet and flicks (slang for movie)
Nikon, from Nippon Kōgaku and Ikon
Pinterest, from pin and interest
Poo-Pourri, from poo and potpourri
Popsicle, from (soda) pop or lollipop and Epsicle (Epsicle itself a portmanteau of Epperson (“the surname of the inventor”) and icicle)
Privoxy, from privacy and proxy
Qualcomm, from Quality and Communications
RuPay, from rupee and payment
Rustoleum, from rust and linoleum
Spotify, from spot and identify
Teletoon, from television and cartoon
Toonami, from cartoon and tsunami
Toshiba, from Shibaura Seisaku-sho and Tokyo Denki through the merger of Tokyo Shibaura Electric K.K. 
Travelocity, from travel and velocity
Triscuit, from electricity and biscuit
Venezuelanalysis, from Venezuela and analysis
Verizon, from veritas (Latin for truth) and horizon
Victorinox, from Victoria (the company founder's mother) and inox (stainless steel)
Unilever, from Margarine Unie and Lever Brothers
Wikimedia, from Wikipedia and media
Wikipedia, from wiki and encyclopedia
Yelp, from yellow pages and help
Yosicle, from yogurt and popsicle

Places

AfPak, from Afghanistan and Pakistan
Afrabia, from Africa and Arabia
Afro-Eurasia, from Africa, Europe, and Asia
Arlandria, from Arlington, VA and Alexandria, VA
Australasia, from Australia and Asia
Autopia, attraction in Disneyland, from automobile and utopia
Benelux, from Belgium, the Netherlands, and Luxembourg
Birome, from Bickham and Jerome Cartwright, landowners
BosWash, from Boston and Washington, D.C.
Brockton, from Brant, Greenock and Walkerton
 Calexico, from California and Mexico
Calistoga, from California and Saratoga
Canwood, from Canadian woodlands
Chambana, from Champaign and Urbana
Chiberia, from Chicago and Siberia
Chindia, from China and India
Chiraq, from Chicago and Iraq
Chimerica, from China and America
Clerval, from claire vallée, French for "clear valley"
Cotai, from Coloane and Taipa
Czechoslovakia, from Czechia and Slovakia
Dalworthington Gardens, a city in north Texas, from Dallas, Fort Worth, and Arlington
Delmarva, from Delaware, Maryland, and Virginia
Delran Township, from the Delaware River and Rancocas Creek
 Donbas, from Donets coal basin
Eurabia, from Europe and Arabia
Eurasia, from Europe and Asia
Fairborn, from Fairfield and Osborn
Glenbard, from Glen Ellyn and Lombard
Harvey Cedars, from harvest and cedars
Hillcrest, from Country Club Hills and Hazel Crest
Hollansburg, from Hollaman and Harland, landowners
Hotlanta, from hot and Atlanta
Illiana, from Illinois and Indiana
Indialantic, from Indian River Lagoon and the Atlantic Ocean
Irrigon, from irrigation and Oregon
Jardee, from Jardanup and Deeside
Kanorado, from Kansas And Colorado
Kanwaka Township and Kanwaka, from the Kansas and Wakarusa Rivers
Kentuckiana, from Kentucky and Indiana
Kormak, from Charles Korpela and Oscar Maki, settlers
Mexicali, from Mexico and California
Michiana, from Michigan and Indiana
Navelencia, from navel and Valencia oranges
NYLON, from New York City and London
Nylonkong, from New York City, London, and Hong Kong
Ohaton, from the Osler, Hammond and Nanton company
Pennsyltucky, from Pennsylvania and Kentucky
Poictesme, from the two French towns Poitiers and Angoulême, used in a number of novels by James Branch Cabell
Sauk Prairie, from Sauk City and Prairie du Sac
Scarberia, from Scarborough and Siberia
SeaTac and Sea-Tac Airport, from Seattle and Tacoma
Stravenue, from street and avenue
Tamiami, from Tampa and Miami
Tanzania, from Tanganyika and Zanzibar
Texarkana, from Texas, Arkansas, and Louisiana
Texoma, from Texas and Oklahoma
The Tridge, from Tri-Cities and bridge
Valsetz, from the Valley and Siletz Railroad, now a ghost town
Vansterdam, from Vancouver and Amsterdam
WaKeeney, from Warren, Keeney, & Co.
Willowick, from Willoughby and Wickliffe, OH
Woolaroc, from woods, lakes and rocks

Politics

agitprop, from agitation and propaganda
beurgeois, from beur and bourgeois
Cocacolonization, from Coca-Cola and colonization
copaganda, from cop and propaganda
Demoncrat, from demon and Democrat
Eracism, from erase and racism
feminazi, from feminist and Nazi
Gerrymander, from Elbridge Gerry and salamander
kayaktivism, from kayaks and activism
Merkozy, from Angela Merkel and Nicolas Sarkozy
Obamacare, from Barack Obama and healthcare
Obamney, from Barack Obama and Mitt Romney
precariat, from precarious and proletariat
Putler, from Vladimir Putin and Adolf Hitler
Rashism, from Russia and fascism
Republicant, from Republican and can't
Ruthanasia, from Ruth Richardson and euthanasia
squirearchy, from squire and hierarchy
Trumponomics, from Donald Trump and economics (see Reaganomics)
Trumpster diving, from Donald Trump and dumpster diving
Trumpster fire, from Donald Trump and dumpster fire
warphans from war and orphans
wikiality, from Wikipedia and reality
Zupta, from Jacob Zuma and Gupta

Economics 

Abenomics, from Shinzō Abe and economics
Bidenomics, from Joe Biden and economics
Clintonomics, from Bill Clinton and economics
Freakonomics, from freak and economics
Moneygeddon, from money and Armageddon (permanent scare of financial crises)
Reaganomics, from Ronald Reagan and economics
Rogernomics, from Roger Douglas and economics
Rubinomics, from Robert Rubin and economics
shrinkflation, from shrink and inflation
stagflation, from stagnation and inflation
tokenomics, from token and economics
Trussonomics, from Liz Truss and economics
Volfefe index, from volatility and covfefe
Orbanomics, from Viktor Orbán and economics

Movements 

agrihood, from agriculture and neighborhood
Berniecrat, from Bernie Sanders and Democrat
Blexit, from black and exit
Brexit, from Britain and exit (with regards to leaving the EU)
Chrislam, from Christianity and Islam
Czexit, from Czech Republic and exit
Danexit, from Dane and exit
Dixiecrat, from Dixie and Democrat
Fixit, from Finland and exit (with regards to leaving the EU)
Frexit, from France and exit
Grexit, from Greece and exit
Huxit, from Hungary and exit
Lexit, from left and Brexit
Nexit, from Netherlands and exit
Qultists, from QAnon and cultists
regrexit, from regret and Brexit
Roexit, from Romania and exit
Texit, from Texas and exit
thinspiration, from thin and inspiration
Trumpanzees, from Donald Trump and chimpanzees

Sciences

abzyme, from antibody and enzyme
alkyd, from alkyl (alcohol) and id (acid or anhydride)
ampacity, from ampere and capacity
aquaponics, from aquaculture and hydroponics
atomaniac, from atom and maniac
biomarker, from biological and marker
bionics, from biology and electronics
botox, from botulism and toxin
brinicle, from brine and icicle
caplet, from capsule and tablet
carborundum, from carbon and corundum
cermet, from ceramic and metal
chemokine, from chemotactic and cytokine
chemtrail, from chemical and contrail
clopen set, from closed-open set
contrail, from condensation and trail
cryptochrome, from cryptogam and chromatic
cultivar, from cultivated and variety
cyborg, from cybernetic and organism
diabesity, from diabetes and obesity
digipeater, from digital and repeater
endorphin, from endogenous and morphine
electret, from electricity and magnet
fogponics, from fog and aeroponics
genome, from gene and chromosome
geofact, from geological and artifact
gleeking, from sublingual gland and leaking
glocalization, from globalization and local
glymphatic system, from glial and lymphatic
grism, from grating and prism
guesstimate, from guess and estimate
henipavirus, from Hendra virus and Nipah virus
hermaphrodite, from Hermes and Aphrodite
lavacicle, from lava and icicle
lidar, from light and radar
mafic, from magnesium and ferric
melatonin, from melanin and serotonin
memristor, from memory and transistor
mesohigh, from mesoscale and high-pressure area
mesolow, from mesoscale and low-pressure area
mesonet, from mesoscale and network
Nastronaut, from NASA and astronaut
nutraceutical, from nutrition and pharmaceutical
pellistor, from pellet and resistor
permaculture, from permanent and agriculture or culture
petrochemical, from petroleum and chemical
positron, from positive and electron
prion, from protein and infection
proteome, from proteins and genome
pulsar, from pulsating and quasar
purine, from pure and urine
quoats, from quality and oats
radome, from radar and dome
redox, from reduction and oxidation
resorcin, from resin and orcin
rusticle, from rust and icicle
spintronic, from spin and electronics
sporabola, from spore and parabola
stiction, from static and friction
surfactant, from surface active agent
synzyme, from synthetic and enzyme
telematics, from telecommunications and informatics
trivection, from triple and convection
vitamin, from vita and amine
warfarin, from WARF (Wisconsin Alumni Research Foundation) and coumarin
wavicle, from wave and particle

Sports and fitness

athleisure, from athletic and leisure
dancercise, from dancing and exercise
Deaflympics, from deaf and Olympics
exercycle, from exercise and bicycle
flymph, from fly (fishing) and nymph
gun fu, from gun and kung fu
gymcel, from gym and incel
Gymkata, from gymnastics and karate
Gymkhana, from gymnasium and Jama'at Khana
heelies, from heel and wheelie
heliskiing, from helicopter and skiing
Jazzercise, from jazz and exercise
Mobot, from Mo (Farah) and robot
Motocross, from motorcycle and cross country
Monzanapolis, from Monza and Indianapolis
Paralympics, from parallel (originally paraplegic) and Olympics
parasailing, from parachute and sailing
plogging, from “plocka” (Swedish “pick up”) and jogging
Prancercise, from prance and exercise
SerAndy, from Serena Williams and Sir Andy Murray
slurve, from slider and curve (baseball pitches)
snuba, from snorkel and scuba
TaeBo, from Taekwondo and boxing
urinalysis, from urine and analysis
wallyball, from wall and volleyball

Transport

Bakerloo line, from Baker Street and Waterloo Railway
boatercycle, from boat and motorcycle
Borismaster, from Boris Johnson and AEC Routemaster
boxster, from boxer engine and roadster
Chunnel, from (English) Channel and tunnel
flaperon, from flap and aileron
frunk, from front and trunk
Ioniq, from ion and unique
Jeepster, from Jeep and roadster
jetiquette, from jet and etiquette
moped, from motor and pedal
motorcade, from motor and cavalcade
motorcycle, from motorized and bicycle
Onevia; from 180SX (front) and Silvia (rear), opposite of Sileighty
Proudia, from proud and diamond
Sileighty; from Silvia (front) and 180SX (rear) two Nissan sport coupes (that share parts that can be easily transferred from one to the other),
taxicab, from taximeter and cabriolet
Toppo, from top (roof) and the Japanese word noppo (lanky)
trimaran, from triple and catamaran
tritoon, from triple and pontoon
truggy, from pick-up truck and dune buggy
Venza, from venture and Monza

See also
List of acronyms
Syllabic abbreviation

References

Lists of English words